Selborne College is a semi-private English medium male-only high school situated in the suburb of Selborne (the suburb was named after the school) of East London in the Eastern Cape province of South Africa; it is one of the few colleges in the Eastern Cape provinces, it is one of the oldest schools in South Africa, The sister school is Clarendon High School for Girls.

On 8 November 1924, Sir Frederic de Waal, then Administrator of the Cape Province, unveiled the War Memorial which stands in front of the school. At the conclusion of this moving service of Dedication, Sir Frederic turned to Charles Prior, Head Boy of the College, and handed him a large silver key. "You are to look after the monument and this consecrated ground on which we now stand", he told Prior. "You have in keeping the memory of many men who made the supreme sacrifice.

Their memory and what they died for will live forever as the generations come and go". Later that month the first Ceremony of the Key was held as Prior passed his charge on to the 1925 Custodian and a new tradition was born.

Every year since, a member of the incoming Matriculation Class has been elected by popular vote of his fellows as the Custodian of the Key for one year and the handing-over ceremony is now a traditional part of Founders’ Day proceedings.

In September 1939 the Officer Commanding of the Cadet Detachment, Colonel Tim Harvey, gave the ceremony its present form and authentic military flavour. The format has remained unaltered to this day. The Key is regarded as a symbol of guardianship of, and responsibility for, the traditions and values of Selborne. The "Changing of Guard", with the Grade 12 group handing custody to the Grade 11's symbolizes the passage of responsibility for, and leadership of the pupil body and all it holds dear, from those departing to those remaining.

Those on parade at Founders’ Day are all current pupils at the College. Wreaths are laid to honour old boys who have paid the supreme sacrifice. The Founders’ Day is strongly supported by visiting Old Boys and their families.

History
Selborne College was founded in 8 October 1872 by Pastor Heinrich Muller, a German settler, and at that stage was known as the Panmure Public School. In 1880 the first recorded sporting engagement involving the school took place: a cricket match against Dale College in King William's Town.

In 1892 another sporting milestone was reached when this school played its first rugby match. Again the opponents were Dale College.

After Pastor Muller's resignation in 1896, John Young piloted the school through an eventful seven-year period that encompassed the Anglo-Boer War and saw the school move premises to Muir Street. It was under headmaster George Rattray, in 1907, that the school was named Selborne College in honour of the Second Earl of Selborne, High Commissioner from 1905 to 1910, whose Selborne Memorandum became the blueprint for the Union of South Africa.

The Selborne family coat of arms and motto were adopted as the College badge and motto: Palma Virtuti ('Reward is to the Brave') underpins the approach to both the academic and extra-curricular activities of the school. By 1920 it became evident that the school was once again outgrowing its premises and in May 1922 the foundation stone was laid by Sir Frederic de Waal, Administrator of the Cape, on the present site of Selborne College.

Dr Rattray, when he handed over the reins to George Floyd at the beginning of 1931, had forged the character of Selborne. Under Floyd strong emphasis was laid on sporting as well as academic achievement and in the post-war years Selborne continued to maintain an impressive record of progress. Mr Floyd was succeeded by John Perry (1949–1958), after whom came Alan Barker (1959–1968).

John Stonier took over the reins of the school in 1969, and was succeeded by Tim Gordon (1981–1992), in whose final year the East London City Council presented the College with an illuminated address in recognition of the school's 120 years of service to the community. 1993 saw Alan (Sam) Gunn take over as headmaster until his retirement in November 2014. With 21 years service, Gunn is the longest serving headmaster in the College's history. The current headmaster Andrew Dewar was appointed in 2015 and is the first Old Selbornian to fill the post having matriculated from Selborne College in 1988

Today, Selborne College is still heavily reliant on traditions; one of these is the Ceremony of the Key, instituted in 1924 at the unveiling of the War Memorial statue of the young soldier that stands in front of the school, and takes place on Founders' Day. With this ceremony, boys reaffirm their recognition of the achievements and sacrifices of the past and of their responsibilities to the future.

Traditions
On 8 November 1924, Sir Frederic de Waal, then Administrator of the Cape Province, unveiled the War Memorial which stands in front of the school. At the conclusion of his service of Dedication, Sir Frederic turned to Charles Prior, Head Boy of the College, and handed him a large silver key. "You are to look after the monument and this consecrated ground on which we now stand", he told Prior. "You have in keeping the memory of many men who made the supreme sacrifice. Their memory and what they died for will live forever as the generations come and go". Later that month the first Ceremony of the Key was held as Prior passed his charge on to the 1925 Custodian and a new tradition was born.

Every year since, a member of the incoming Matriculation Class has been elected by popular vote of his fellows as the Custodian of the Key for one year and the handing-over ceremony is now a traditional part of Founders' Day proceedings.

In September 1939 the Officer Commanding of the Cadet Detachment, Colonel Tim Harvey, gave the ceremony its present form and authentic military flavour. The format has remained unaltered to this day. The Key is regarded as a symbol of guardianship of, and responsibility for, the traditions and values of Selborne. The "Changing of Guard", with the Grade 12 group handing custody to the Grade 11's symbolizes the passage of responsibility for, and leadership of the pupil body and all it holds dear, from those departing to those remaining.

Those on parade at Founders' Day are all current pupils at the College. Wreaths are laid to honour alumni (also known informally as Old Boys) who have paid the supreme sacrifice. The Founders' Day is strongly supported by visiting Old Boys and their families.

The guest speaker for Founders' Day 2008 was past headmaster, Dr John Stonier.

Norton House
The school hostel is named after one of the school's more well-known alumni, Toys Norton, V.C. The hostel accommodates approximately 75 boys. Boys in Grades 8 to 11 are accommodated in rooms of 4 or 5, while most Grade 12 students have single or double rooms. All meals are prepared in-house and laundry is done by cleaning staff. The hostel adheres to a strict academic routine, whereby homework sessions are supervised every evening.

Facilities include a common room with pool table, access to DStv, a small gymnasium, access to the school pool (with supervision) and a study area – which contains computers networked to the school intranet and internet. Four teachers perform supervisory duties in the hostel and live on the premises, and two matrons look after the boys. The domestic staff sometimes stay on for much longer than a school term, with some staff employment periods spanning generations.

Sports
Sports offered in Selborne College include athletics, cricket, cross country, hockey, rowing, rugby, squash, swimming, tennis and water polo. Facilities include three rugby fields and a hockey astro turf, cricket nets, a waterpolo pool and a hockey Astroturf. The school also has a fully-equipped fitness centre.

The sports that are played at the school are:
 Archery
 Athletics
 Cricket
 Cross country
 Diving 
 Golf 
 Hockey
 Rowing  - Selborne College is the oldest school rowing club in South Africa.
 Rugby
 Soccer
 Squash
 Swimming
 Table tennis
 Tennis
 Water polo

Traditional rivals

Selborne counts Dale College, Grey High School and Queen's College as its oldest sporting rivals.

Notable Old Selbornians

Badminton

Jacob Maliekal, South African Badminton player, competed at 2016 Olympics in Rio

Cricket

Mark Boucher, South African international cricketer (wicket-keeper), South African Cricket Coach
Geoff Chubb, South African international cricketer

Field hockey

Leroy Phillips South African International Hockey Player
Andrew Dewar International Hockey umpire
 John Wright International Hockey umpire
 Peter Wright International Hockey umpire
 Deon Nel International Hockey umpire
 Robin Jones South African International Hockey Player
 Richard Pautz South African International Hockey Player
 Dalan Phillips South African International Hockey Player

Motorsport

Wayne Taylor, International motor racing driver
Jody Scheckter 1979 Formula One World Champion
Ian Scheckter Formula one motor racing driver.

Rugby union

André Vos, South African rugby international & Captain (flanker)
Ray Carlson, South African rugby international
Keith Andrews, South African rugby international
Mark Andrews, South African rugby international and Rugby World Cup Winner
Brent Russell, South African rugby international
 Rory Kockott, French Rugby International
 Tango Balekile, U20 South African player 
 Chris Cloete, SA A Rugby player
 Mnombo Zwelendaba, U20 South African player
 Leon Lyons , South African professional rugby player for Stormers 
 Michael Botha, South African professional Rugby union player for Southern Kings
 Thomas Bursey, South African professional rugby player 
 Jacques Goosen, South African professional rugby player for Stormers
 Jarrod Taylor, South African professional rugby player for Western Province

Squash
Craig Van der Wath, South African Squash International

Swimming

Jonty Skinner, 1976 freestyle 100 metre world record
Brett Petersen, 1999 Gold Breaststroke All Africa Games - 2000 Olympics Top 8

Water polo 

 Matthew Palmer, South African Player (2000)

Other

Allan Gray, CEO of Allan Gray Limited
Air Marshal Sir Leonard Slatter, RAF commander
Captain Toys Norton awarded Victoria Cross, World War II
Anaso Jobodwana, South African Olympian at 2012 Summer Olympics
Derek Tarr, former American professional tennis player
Saul Teukolsky, Astrophysicist

References

External links
Selborne College official site
History of Selborne College
Rugby365 profile

Boarding schools in South Africa
Schools in the Eastern Cape
Educational institutions established in 1872
1872 establishments in the Cape Colony
East London, Eastern Cape